Anatina is a genus of saltwater clams, marine bivalve molluscs in the family Mactridae.

Species
Species within the genus Anatina include:
 Anatina anatina (Spengler, 1802)
 Anatina cyprina (W. Wood, 1828)
 Anatina inconstans (Cosel, 1995)
 Anatina vitrea (Spengler, 1802)

References

Mactridae
Bivalve genera